Caprera is an island in the Maddalena archipelago off the coast of Sardinia, Italy.

Caprera may also refer to:
 Italian cruiser Caprera, 1894-1913
 479 Caprera, a minor planet

See also
 Cabrera (disambiguation)
 Centro Velico Caprera, an Italian sailing school based in Caprera